The Florida Atlantic Owls men's basketball statistical leaders are individual statistical leaders of the Florida Atlantic Owls men's basketball program in various categories, including points, rebounds, assists, steals, and blocks. Within those areas, the lists identify single-game, single-season, and career leaders. The Owls represent Florida Atlantic University in the NCAA's Conference USA.

Florida Atlantic began competing in intercollegiate basketball in 1988. These lists are updated through the end of the 2020–21 season.

Scoring

Rebounds

Assists

Steals

Blocks

References

Lists of college basketball statistical leaders by team
Statistical